The 2020–21 Four Hills Tournament, part of the 2020–21 FIS Ski Jumping World Cup, took place at the four traditional venues of Oberstdorf, Garmisch-Partenkirchen, Innsbruck and Bischofshofen, located in Germany and Austria, between 28 December 2020 and 6 January 2021.

Results

Oberstdorf

 HS 137 Schattenbergschanze, Germany
29 December 2020

Garmisch-Partenkirchen

 HS 142 Große Olympiaschanze, Germany
1 January 2021

Innsbruck

 HS 128 Bergiselschanze, Austria
3 January 2021

Bischofshofen

 HS 142 Paul-Ausserleitner-Schanze, Austria
6 January 2021

Overall standings
The final standings after all four events:

References

External links 
 

2020-21
2020 in ski jumping
2021 in ski jumping
2020 in German sport
2021 in German sport
2021 in Austrian sport
December 2020 sports events in Germany
January 2021 sports events in Germany
January 2021 sports events in Europe